is a railway station on the Osaka Metro Chuo Line in Higashinari-ku, Osaka, Japan.

While this station is situated near the  station operated by JR West, there are no transfer passageways between the two stations. Passengers transferring between these two stations must use buses to transfer between trains.

Layout
There are two side platforms and two tracks under the ground level.

Surrounding area

This industrial area of East Osaka features mostly factories and residential areas.

Higashinari-ku, Osaka
Jōtō-ku, Osaka
Osaka Metro stations
Railway stations in Osaka
Railway stations in Japan opened in 1968